Henry Trotman (born 19 July 1837, date of death unknown) was a Barbadian cricketer. He played in one first-class match for the Barbados cricket team in 1865/66.

See also
 List of Barbadian representative cricketers

References

External links
 

1837 births
Year of death missing
Barbadian cricketers
Barbados cricketers
People from Saint George, Barbados